Kill the King may refer to:

Kill the King (album), by T.I.
"Kill the King" (song), by Megadeth
"Kill the King" (song), by Rainbow
"Kill the King (The Avengers)", episode from Series 1 of The Avengers
Shangri-La Suite, a 2016 crime drama film also known as Kill the King